Majiméouni is a village in the commune of Bouéni in Mayotte.

References 

Populated places in Mayotte